Uperodon globulosus, or Indian balloon frog, is a species of narrow-mouthed frog found in India, Nepal, and Bangladesh. It is known under many common names: Indian globular frog, Indian balloon frog, grey balloon frog, and greater balloon frog. Specimens from the Western Ghats may represent an undescribed species.

Uperodon globulosus is very stout in appearance, even more so than its close relative Uperodon systoma. It is a fossorial species that is found in both forests and agricultural land.

References

globulosus
Amphibians of Bangladesh
Frogs of India
Amphibians of Nepal
Amphibians described in 1864
Taxa named by Albert Günther